The ruisseau du Moulin (English: brook of the Mill) is a tributary of chenal de l'Île d'Orléans, flowing in the municipality of Sainte-Famille-de-l'Île-d'Orléans and Saint-François-de-l'Île-d'Orléans, in the regional county municipality (MRC) of L'Île-d'Orléans Regional County Municipality, in the administrative region of Capitale-Nationale, in the province of Quebec, of Canada.

The lower part of this small valley is served by Chemin Royale (route 368) which bypasses all of Île d'Orléans. Agriculture is the main economic activity in this small valley.

The surface of the Moulin stream is generally frozen from the beginning of December until the end of March, except for the rapids areas in the lower part; however, safe circulation on the ice is generally done from mid-December to mid-March. The water level of the river varies with the seasons and the precipitation; the spring flood occurs in March or April.

Geography 
The Moulin stream rises at the limit of the forest and agricultural area, more or less in the center of the island, in Sainte-Famille-de-l'Île-d'Orléans.

The Moulin stream flows to the bottom of Anse aux Canards, near the Pointe de la Croix. This mouth is located on the south shore of the chenal de l'Île d'Orléans (which is connected to the St. Lawrence River) in Saint-François-de-l'Île-d'Orléans.

Toponymy 
Formerly, this watercourse was designated "Argentenay river". The point located at the extreme north of the island is designated Pointe Argentenay; it is surrounded by sandstone at low tide. The toponym "ruisseau du Moulin" refers to a modest mill erected in the 18th century along its course, probably near the mouth. According to the popular usage of the inhabitants of the island, this river is considered a river and not a stream. Three rivers of this island are designated according to the existence of a mill built on their respective course.

The toponym "brook of the Moulin" was formalized on December 5, 1968 at the Bank of Place Names of the Commission de toponymie du Québec.

See also 

 Capitale-Nationale, an administrative region
 L'Île-d'Orléans Regional County Municipality (MRC)
 Île d'Orléans, an island
 Sainte-Famille-de-l'Île-d'Orléans
 Saint-François-de-l'Île-d'Orléans
 Chenal de l'Île d'Orléans
 St. Lawrence River
 List of rivers of Quebec

Notes and references 

Rivers of Capitale-Nationale
L'Île-d'Orléans Regional County Municipality